Tricia Cooke (born June 25, 1965) is an American film editor married to American film director Ethan Coen. They live in New York City.

Filmography
Cooke has worked as an editor or associate editor on many of the Coen brothers' films. Her filmography includes the following:

Miller's Crossing (1990)
Barton Fink (1991)
The Hudsucker Proxy (1994)
Fargo (1996)
Where the Air Is Cool and Dark (1997)
Betty (1997)
The Big Lebowski (1998)
The 4th Floor (1999)
Weeping Shriner (1999)
O Brother, Where Art Thou? (2000)
The Man Who Wasn't There (2001)
Where the Girls Are (2003)
The Adventures of Seinfeld & Superman (2004)
The Notorious Bettie Page (2005)
The Ex (2006)
Eve (short film) (2008)
Jerry Lee Lewis: Trouble in Mind (documentary) (2022)

References

External links

Living people
Artists from New York City
Place of birth missing (living people)
American film editors
American women film editors
1965 births
21st-century American women